Huttange (Luxembourgish: Hitten) is a village in northwestern Luxembourg.

It is situated in the commune of Beckerich and has a population of 29.

Gallery

References 

Villages in Luxembourg